Telecommunications in Bulgaria include radio, television, fixed and mobile telephones, and the Internet.

Radio and television

 Radio broadcast stations: AM 31, FM 63, shortwave 2 (2001).
 Radio broadcast hours: 525,511 (2003).
 Television broadcast stations: 39 (2001).
 Television broadcast hours: 498,091 (2003).

Telephones

 Main lines in use: 1.6 million (2015 est).
 Mobile cellular: 8.98 million lines (2016).
 Telephone system:
 General assessment: an extensive but antiquated telecommunications network inherited from the Soviet era; quality has improved; the Bulgaria Telecommunications Company's fixed-line monopoly terminated in 2005 when alternative fixed-line operators were given access to its network; a drop in fixed-line connections in recent years has been more than offset by a sharp increase in mobile-cellular telephone use fostered by multiple service providers; the number of cellular telephone subscriptions now exceeds the population
 Domestic:  a fairly modern digital cable trunk line now connects switching centers in most of the regions; the others are connected by digital microwave radio relay
 International:  country code – 359; submarine cable provides connectivity to Ukraine and Russia; a combination submarine cable and land fiber-optic system provides connectivity to Italy, Albania, and North Macedonia; satellite earth stations – 3 (1 Intersputnik in the Atlantic Ocean region, 2 Intelsat in the Atlantic and Indian Ocean regions) (2007).

Internet

 Top-level domains: .bg and .бг (proposed, Cyrillic).
 Internet users: 
 4.1 million users (2016) 
 3.9 million users, 72nd in the world; 55.1% of the population, 74th in the world (2012); 
 3.4 million users, 63rd in the world (2009);
 1.9 million users (2007).
 Fixed broadband: 1.2 million subscriptions, 52nd in the world; 17.6% of population, 53rd in the world (2012).
 Wireless broadband: 2.8 million, 55th in the world; 40.3% of the population, 41st in the world (2012).
 Internet hosts: 
 976,277 hosts, 47th in the world (2012);
 513,470 (2008).
 IPv4: 4.2 million addresses allocated, 0.1% of the world total, 589.7 addresses per 1000 people, 51st in the world (2012).

See also

 Internet Society – Bulgaria
 List of internet service providers in Bulgaria
 Bulgaria

References